Branislav Ikonić (21 June 1928 – 16 January 2002) was a  Yugoslav and Serbian politician.

Biography
He graduated from the University of Belgrade School of Electrical Engineering and worked in "Viskoza" company from Loznica as an engineer, technical and general director of the company until 1965. Afterwards he served as the vice president, president of the Republic Chamber of Commerce of Serbia. Ikonić held a number of political positions in Serbia and Yugoslavia.

He is one of the few Serbian politicians who, after the Milošević-Stambolić split, did not side with Milošević's faction.

References

1928 births
2002 deaths
Serbian politicians
Deputy Prime Ministers of Serbia
Prime Ministers of Serbia
Presidents of the National Assembly (Serbia)
20th-century Serbian people